Sialoadhesin is a cell adhesion molecule found on the surface of macrophages. It is found in especially high amounts on macrophages of the spleen, liver, lymph node, bone marrow, colon, and lungs. Also, in patients with rheumatoid arthritis, the protein has been found in great amounts on macrophages of the affected tissues. It is defined as an I-type lectin, since it contains 17 immunoglobulin (Ig) domains (one variable domain and 16 constant domains), and thus also belongs to the immunoglobulin superfamily (IgSF).  Sialoadhesin binds to certain molecules called sialic acids. During this binding process a salt bridge (protein) is formed between a highly conserved arginine residue (from the v-set domain to the 3'-sialyllactose) and the carboxylate group of the sialic acid. Since sialoadhesin binds sialic acids with its N-terminal IgV-domain, it is also a member of the SIGLEC family. Alternate names for sialoadhesin include siglec-1 and CD169 (cluster of differentiation 169).

Sialoadhesin predominantly binds neutrophils, but can also bind monocytes, natural killer cells, B cells and a subset of cytotoxic T cells by interacting with sialic acid molecules in the ligands on their surfaces.

Sialoadhesin (CD169) positive macrophages, along with mesenchymal stem cells and beta-adrenergic neurons, form the hematopoietic stem cell niche in the bone marrow.  CD169+ macrophages mediate signaling between the various cells and seem to promote hematopoietic stem cell retention to the niche.

References

Clusters of differentiation
SIGLEC